A significant other is a partner in an intimate relationship. 

Significant Other or Significant Others may also refer to:

Film and television
 Significant Other (film), 2022 American sci-fi horror film
 Significant Others (1998 TV series), an American drama series on the Fox Network
 Significant Others (2004 TV series), an American sitcom on Bravo
 Significant Others (2022 TV series), 2022 Australian TV series written by Tommy Murphy

Episodes
 "significANT other", an episode from season 2 of A.N.T. Farm
 "Significant Other", an episode from season 1 of People of Earth
 "Significant Others", an episode from season 5 of Castle
 "Significant Others", an episode from season 1 of Hearts Afire
 "Significant Others", an episode from season 3 of Party of Five
 "Significant Others", an episode from season 1 of QB1: Beyond the Lights
 "Significant Others", an episode from season 3 of Roswell
 "Significant Others", an episode from the web series The Outs
 "Significant Others", an episode from season 2 of The Smoking Room

Other uses 
 Significant Other (album), a 1999 album by Limp Bizkit
 Significant Other (play), a 2015 stage play
 Significant Others (novel), a 1987 work by Armistead Maupin

See also

 or